Zimbabwe Independent is a private weekly newspaper published from Harare, Zimbabwe, by Alpha Media Holdings. The company also publishes The Standard and NewsDay.

See also 

 The Standard
 NewsDay

References

External links

 

Mass media in Zimbabwe
Newspapers published in Zimbabwe
Mass media in Harare